Maor Bar Buzaglo (born 14 January 1988) is an Israeli former professional footballer who played as a midfielder.

Early life
Buzaglo was born in Karmiel, Israel, to a Sephardic Jewish family.

He also holds a Portuguese passport, which eased his moved to some European football leagues.

Club career

Youth career
Buzaglo played for the youth clubs of Maccabi Tel Aviv, Hapoel Tel Aviv and Beitar Jerusalem. In 2002, he went on trial to Juventus and participated in a youth tournament. At this tournament he was scouted by Lyon with whom he signed. After a year in France he returned to Israel joining Maccabi Haifa.

Hapoel Petah Tikva (loan)
Buzaglo played two matches for Maccabi Haifa, before being loaned out to Hapoel Petah Tikva for the 2006–07 season. In 21 league matches for the club he scored five goals including a hat-trick against Hakoah Amidar Ramat Gan in a 3–2 victory.

Bnei Sakhnin (loan)
Buzaglo spent the following 2007–08 season on loan at newly promoted club Bnei Sakhnin. He scored nine goals in the season while the club finished fourth in the league earning qualification for the opening rounds of the Intertoto Cup. He was named Discovery of the Year at the end of the season.

Maccabi Tel Aviv
On 30 July 2008, Buzaglo left Maccabi Haifa and signed to a four-year contract with Maccabi Tel Aviv after long negotiations between Haifa and his father (who is also his agent). In the last game of 2008–09 season Buzaglo tore his knee ligaments forcing him out of action for seven months. He returned midway through the 2009–10 season and went on to score 3 goals and assisting 5. He finished the 2010–11 season with four goals. At the end of the 2010–11 season he criticised the club publicly in an interview to the Israeli press which, along with his father's criticism, resulted in a misconduct fine and suspension from the club. On 26 June club owner Mitchell Goldhar announced that Buzaglo would no longer be part of the first-team's plans and instead be placed on the transfer list.

Standard Liège
On 19 August 2011, Buzaglo signed a two-year contract with Belgian club Standard Liège for a transfer fee of €440,000. In his first season with the club he made ten caps without any goals or assists. In his second and last season with the club he made 21 caps with a goal and two assists to his name.

Hapoel Be'er Sheva
On 1 July 2013, Buzaglo signed a one-year contract with Hapoel Be'er Sheva, with option for two more years. In his first season at Be'er Sheva, he scored ten goals and assisted 14 becoming the highest assist provider of the 2013–14 season. On 15 September 2016, Buzaglo scored the second goal versus Inter Milan at San Siro in a Europa League match, which lead to a 2–0 victory for his team (Hapoel Be'er Sheva 5–2 Inter Milan on aggregate).

Maccabi Haifa
In December 2017 Buzaglo re-injured one of his ACLs after a long period of recuperation, meaning that he would be unable to participate in the rest of the season as a Maccabi Haifa player.

Beitar Jerusalem
In August 2018, Buzaglo signed for Beitar Jerusalem. Still not fully fit following the knee injury that had kept him out during the previous season, it was expected that he would be able to resume full training after a month. The transfer was subject to an agreement between the clubs that the contract would be cancelled if Buzaglo were to suffer a recurrence of the injury.
He scored his first goal at Beitar Jerusalem on 5 November 2018 with a free kick from 20 meters against Maccabi Haifa.
On 21 May 2019, Buzaglo scored twice in a friendly match versus Atlético Madrid, at the Teddy Stadium of Jerusalem, where Beitar finished with a 2–1 win.

Hapoel Tel Aviv
On 29 June 2019, Buzaglo signed at Hapoel Tel Aviv for two years.

Retirement
Buzaglo announced his retirement from playing in January 2022, aged 34.

International career

Buzaglo has represented his country from a very early age, from the U17 level to the senior team. At U19 level, Buzaglo scored 21 goals in 34 matches, including four goals in one game against Denmark in a Milk Cup match in 2007. For the Israel U21 team, Buzaglo scored three times in eight matches.

Buzaglo made his senior international debut for the Israel national team against the Russia in a EURO 2008 qualifier on 17 November 2007.

Personal life
Maor's father is Jacob Buzaglo a former Israeli footballer who played in the 70's and 80's for Hapoel Tel Aviv, and Beitar Jerusalem. Older brother Asi Buzaglo is also a former footballer, youngest brother Almog Buzaglo is an active player, and eldest brother Ohad Buzaglo is a football manager.

Maor is married to Miran Nimni, Israeli former footballer Avi Nimni's niece (as well as his former manager at Maccabi Tel Aviv). They had their first set of twins in 2012, and another set of twins in 2017.

Career statistics

Honours
Maccabi Haifa
 Israeli Premier League: 2005–06

Maccabi Tel Aviv
 Toto cup top Division: 2008–09

Hapoel Be'er Sheva
 Israeli Premier League: 2015–16, 2016–17
Israel Super Cup: 2016
Toto cup top Division: 2016–17

Individual
 Israeli Premier League Discovery of the Year: 2007–08
 Israeli Premier League Top Assist Provider: 2013–14 (14), 2014–15 (10)

References

1988 births
Living people
Israeli Sephardi Jews
Israeli footballers
Association football midfielders
Maccabi Haifa F.C. players
Hapoel Petah Tikva F.C. players
Bnei Sakhnin F.C. players
Maccabi Tel Aviv F.C. players
Standard Liège players
Hapoel Be'er Sheva F.C. players
Beitar Jerusalem F.C. players
Israel international footballers
Israel under-21 international footballers
Israel youth international footballers
Belgian Pro League players
Israeli Premier League players
Israeli expatriate footballers
Expatriate footballers in Belgium
Israeli expatriate sportspeople in Belgium
Footballers from Karmiel
Israeli people of Moroccan-Jewish descent
Israeli Mizrahi Jews
Jewish footballers